Vriesea pabstii is a plant species in the genus Vriesea. This species is endemic to Brazil (Espírito Santo and São Paulo States).

References

THE BROMELIAD SOCIETY BULLETIN V20(3), A NEW SPECIES OF VRIESEA FROM SOUTHEASTERN BRAZIL retrieved 8 September 2011

pabstii
Flora of Brazil